The 2018–19 Slovenian Third League was the 27th edition of the Slovenian Third League. The season began on 17 August 2018 and ended on 2 June 2019.

Competition format and rules
In the 2018–19 season, the Slovenian Third League (3. SNL) was divided into four regional groups with a total of 38 participating clubs. The three groups (North, Centre, East) were composed of ten clubs, while the West group consisted of eight clubs. The group winners played a two-legged play-off for promotion to the Slovenian Second League.

3. SNL Centre
Zarica Kranj withdrew and were replaced by Žiri one week before the start of the season.

Clubs

League table

3. SNL East

Clubs

A total of ten teams competed in the league, including nine sides from the 2017–18 season and one team relegated from the 2017–18 Slovenian Second League (Veržej).

League table

3. SNL North

Clubs

League table

3. SNL West

Clubs

League table

Play-offs 
A two-legged play-offs between the group winners for promotion to the Slovenian Second League.

First leg

Second leg

See also
2018–19 Slovenian First League
2018–19 Slovenian Second League

References

3
Slovenian Third League, 2018-19
Slovenian Third League seasons